Yujing District is a rural district in eastern Tainan, Taiwan. It is famous for its cultivation of mangoes.

After a 6.4-magnitude earthquake hit southern Taiwan in March 2010, pillars were severely damaged at Yujing Junior High School forcing school officials to cancel some classes.

History
The name has also been spelled Tefurang, Tefurangh, Tevoran, Tevourang, and Devoran. Tevorang was one of nine villages that joined in warfare against the people of Favorlang (modern-day Huwei, Yunlin).

During the Kingdom of Tungning, members of the Siraya people from the Tavocan area (modern-day Xinhua) moved to this area due to conflicts with Han Chinese.

The Tapani Incident of 1915 was one of the largest armed uprisings by Taiwanese Han and aboriginals against Japanese rule in Taiwan.

In 1920, political divisions of Taiwan had structural changes and many geographical names were changed into Japanese style. The name Tapani was transliterated as in Japanese Tamai and administratively was called Tamai Village, Tainan Prefecture. During Japanese rule, Tamai produced abundant sugar.

Republic of China
The name Tamai of the very same Japanese Kanji is pronounced Yujing in Mandarin Chinese.
After the handover of Taiwan from Japan to the Republic of China in 1945, Yujing was organized as a rural township of Tainan County. On 25 December 2010, Tainan County was merged with Tainan City and Yujing was upgraded to a district of the city. In the 1960s, with government promotion, the name "Yujing" became almost synonymous with "mangos".

Geography
 Area: 76.3662 km2
 Population: 13,121 people (January 2023)

Administrative divisions
The district consists of Yujing, Yutian, Zhongzheng, Zhuwei, Shatian, Sanpu, Sanhe, Wangming, Cenglin and Fengli Village.

Tourist attractions
 Ancient Battlefield with Memorial Tablet to Yu Qingfang
 Mango Industry Culture Information Hall
 Siiangjhih Park
 Yujing Beiji Temple
 Yusha Oncidium Orchid Garden

Transportation

Bus station in the district is Yujing Bus Station of Shing Nan Bus. The district is connected to Beimen District through Provincial Highway 84.

Notable natives
 Wang Sing-nan, legislator

See also
 Tainan

References

External links

 

Districts of Tainan
Taiwan placenames originating from Formosan languages
Taivoan people